Caherlistrane is a Gaelic Athletic Association club based in County Galway, Ireland. The club is a member of the Galway GAA. Underage teams up to U-16's play in the Galway league and championships while further age groups compete in their respective competitions.

They are one of the oldest established Gaelic Football clubs in Galway. Their only success in the Galway Senior Football Championship came in 1890, and reached their last final in 1892. In recent times, they have looked to bridge that long gap, reaching the semi-finals in 2008. In 2006, they reached the 2006 All-Ireland Intermediate Club Football Championship Final but lost to Inniskeen Grattan's of Monaghan.

Honours
 Galway Senior Football Championship: (1) 1890
 Connacht Intermediate Club Football Championship: (1) 2005
 Galway Intermediate Football Championship: (1) 2005
 Galway Intermediate Football League: (1) 2005
 Galway Junior 'A' Football Championship: (1) 2007
 Galway Minor 'A' Football League: (1) 2007
 Galway Minor Football Championship: (1) 1988

References

External Sources

Gaelic football clubs in County Galway
Gaelic games clubs in County Galway